Nacional FBC (sometimes referred as Nacional) is a Peruvian football club, playing in the city of Mollendo, Islay, Arequipa, Peru.

History
The Club Deportivo Mariscal Miller was founded on April 18, 1923.

Despite being a historic club, they have only won the 1946, 2019 and 2022 Liga Distrital de Mollendo.

In the 2019 Copa Perú, the club classified to the Nacional Stage, but was eliminated by Comerciantes in the Round of 32.

In the 2021 Copa Perú, the club classified to the Regional Stage,  but was eliminated by Futuro Majes in the Fase 1 - Regional.

Honours

Regional
Liga Departamental de Arequipa:
Winners (2): 2019, 2022

Liga Provincial de Islay:
Winners (2): 2019, 2022

Liga Distrital de Mollendo:
Winners (3): 1946, 2019, 2022

See also
List of football clubs in Peru
Peruvian football league system

References

External links

Football clubs in Peru
Association football clubs established in 1923